The ARP 2600 is a semi-modular analog subtractive audio synthesizer produced by ARP Instruments, Inc.

History

Developed by a design team headed by ARP namesake Allen R. Pearlman and engineer Dennis Colin, the ARP 2600 was introduced in 1971 as the successor to ARP's first instrument, the ARP 2500, at a retail price of US$2600.

Unlike other modular systems of the time, which required modules to be purchased individually and wired by the user, the 2600 was semi-modular with a fixed selection of basic synthesizer components internally pre-wired, with clear text labels and front panel screen printed graphics indicating the function of different sections of controls, and the signal flow between them. The 2600 was thus ideal for musicians new to synthesis, due to its ability to be operated either with or without patch cords. On its initial release it was heavily marketed to high schools and universities.

Features and architecture

The ARP 2600 features three VCOs, a 4-pole (24 dB/octave) Low-pass filter, a VCA, a ring modulator, sample and hold, a white/pink noise generator, microphone preamp, spring reverb, two envelope generators, and a four-octave keyboard.

In 1973, Tom Oberheim, who was an ARP dealer, produced a kit that converted the keyboard into a duo-phonic keyboard capable of triggering two different oscillators simultaneously. The following year, ARP adopted this improvement and introduced the Model 3620 duo-phonic keyboard, which also included delayed vibrato as well as single and multiple triggering functionality.

All versions of the ARP 2600 produced through 1976 utilized ARP’s Model 4012 filter, which was an imitation of Robert Moog's 4-pole "ladder" VCF, which became the subject of a patent dispute eventually settled out of court, and was replaced by an ARP filter design, the Model 4072.

Models

Model 2600 “Blue Meanie” (early 1971): The earliest 2600s were assembled in a small facility on Kenneth Street in Newton Highlands, Massachusetts, during ARP's infancy as a company. Housed in a bright blue and light gray aluminum case with a keyboard mated to the synthesizer, this version was nicknamed the "Blue Marvin" (after Marvin Cohen, ARP’s CFO at the time) but is now commonly referred to as the "Blue Meanie.”

Model 2600C “Gray Meanie” (mid-1971): The 2600C was produced in the ARP factory, and featured a gray control panel and updated keyboard model 3604C. Only 35 “Gray Meanies” were produced.

Model 2600P (late-1971): The 2600P was housed in a suitcase-style vinyl-covered wood enclosure, making it a more portable instrument. V2.0 of the 2600P replaced Teledyne 4011/4017 VCO chips with more reliable 4027 chips by National Semiconductor for a brief run in 1972, before being replaced by 2600P v3.0, which was produced until 1974 and utilized 2037-1 VCO chips and featured a new G-clef ARP logo. In 1974, 2600P v4.0 introduced the new Model 3620 duo-phonic keyboard with LFO.

Model 2601 (1975): 2601 v1.0 improved the jacks and slider controls of the previous model, but still included the disputed Model 4012 filter. In 1977, 2601 v2.0 introduced ARP’s new Model 4072 filter, as well as the orange-over-black design theme of ARP’s other synthesizers. One final version of the 2601, v3.0, was produced in ARP’s final days.

Impact

The first significant user of the 2600 was Edgar Winter, who connected the keyboard controller of the 2600 to the main unit via a long extension cord, allowing him to wear the synth around his neck like a keytar. Stevie Wonder was an early adopter of the 2600 who had the control panel instructions labelled in Braille. Other early notable users included Pete Townshend, Joe Zawinul, and Herbie Hancock. 

In the Stories in the Room: Michael Jackson's Thriller Album Podcast, it was confirmed that the bassline for Michael Jackson's legendary single Thriller was created with an ARP 2600, by way of Rod Temperton and/or Anthony Marinelli. The synthesizer was also used for many other songs on the album of the same name as well.

Sound designer Ben Burtt used an ARP 2600, combined with his own voice, to create the voice of R2-D2 in the Star Wars films. Burtt also used the 2600 to create the sound effects of the Ark of the Covenant in Raiders of the Lost Ark.

Software emulations

Software companies, such as Arturia and Way Out Ware, have released software emulations for use with modern music equipment, such as MIDI devices and computer sequencers:

 Arturia ARP 2600 V
 TimewARP 2600
Cherry Audio CA2600

Hardware re-issues and recreations

On January 10, 2020, Korg Inc. of Japan reissued the ARP 2600 as the ARP 2600 FS, a faithful reproduction of the original 1972 gray version.  The re-issue adds features, including: the ability to select between the 4012 and 4072 filter types found in the 1970s versions, balanced XLR outputs, MIDI, a basic sequencer / arpeggiator, and a flight case for travel.  The keyboard included is based on the original 3620 keyboard which now provides aftertouch. In 2022, Korg introduced a smaller version of the 2600 called the 2600M, which was identical to the FS but 40% smaller.

Behringer's 2600
In 2020, Behringer released its own updated variant. In contrast to the original ARP or the versions produced by Korg, the following features are different or new:

 8U 19-inch rack chassis
 No speakers
 Digital spring reverb simulation instead of a physical spring tank (Behringer also makes "Blue Marvin" and "Gray Meanie" versions with a physical spring tank)
 LED faders
 VCO3 can output a sine or triangle wave, and has a PWM patch point
 VCO2 and 3 can sync to VCO1
 Both VCF versions available, selected with switch

TTSH

Beginning in 2013, Swedish DIY synthesizer designer The Human Comparator has created multiple iterations of 3/4 scale PCB kits featuring circuitry and front-panel designs identical to the ARP 2600 (minus the keyboard). Dubbed the TTSH ("Two Thousand Six Hundred"), this project allows a hobbyist to build their own synthesizer for a fraction of the price ($499USD for a panel and PCB set) of the original.

Gallery

Notable users

The following is a partial list of artists and musical groups who have used the ARP 2600:

 808 State
 Ben Burtt — voice of R2-D2 in Star Wars
 Bee Gees — bass in Jive Talkin'
 Brian Eno
 BT
 Chemical Brothers — used on Dig Your Own Hole
 Daniel Miller
 Depeche Mode
 Edgar Winter (Frankenstein)
 Gaudi
 Herbie Hancock
 Jean Michel Jarre
 Joe Zawinul — usually played two with Weather Report, one for each hand
 Mary McCarty Snow
 Nine Inch Nails
 Nitzer Ebb
 Orbital
 Ozzy Osbourne — used on Who Are You?
 Pete Townshend
 Rush (band)
 Stevie Wonder
 Tony Banks (Genesis)
 Underworld
 Vince Clarke
 Greg Phillinganes - used on Thriller (album)

References

External links
The ARP 2600: Evolution and Revolution The Metamorphosis of an Iconic Instrument - Google Arts & Culture / Music Makers Machines exhibit
The Alan R. Pearlman Foundation
Vintage Synth Explorer
ARP 2600 Patch Diagram - Patch Diagram, useful for "saving" your patches
ARP 2600 Test Report - GreatSynthesizers

YouTube links

"Arp2600 Demo" - A YouTube demo of the 2600. Later episodes go into detail about building patches.

ARP synthesizers
Analog synthesizers
Monophonic synthesizers